Craft Weed: Family Farming and the Future of the Marijuana Industry is a 2018 MIT Press book by Ryan Stoa. In it, he argues for an American cannabis industry that looks more like the craft beer industry, and less like "Big Marijuana" equivalent of Anheuser-Busch. The author is an associate professor of law at Concordia University School of Law in Boise, Idaho.

Reception
A review in The Times Literary Supplement said the book author's "expertise is undeniable" but "some of his deeper trawls through legislature slow an otherwise intriguing narrative". Another review found merit in Stoa's advocacy for agricultural law reform around craft cannabis, to include an appellation system for cannabis parallel to that of the American Viticultural Areas (AVAs).

See also
 List of books about cannabis

References

Further reading
 (adapted from the book)
Review by Carrie Cross (2019) Review of Craft Weed: Family Farming and the Future of the Marijuana Industry, Journal of Agricultural & Food Information, 
Review by David Alan Guba in Social History of Alcohol and Drugs: An Interdisciplinary Journal, Alcohol and Drugs History Society

External links

 (MIT Press)

2018 non-fiction books
Agricultural law
American books about cannabis law reform
Non-fiction books about cannabis
MIT Press books